Of Breath and Bone is the third studio album by Australian melodic death metal band, Be'lakor. It was released on 1 June 2012. In the 2012  metalstorm.net awards, Of Breath and Bone won “Best Melodeth/Extreme Power/Gothenburg” album.

Track listing

Cover art
The cover art is a copy of Gabriel Ferrier's Chaperon Rouge painting.

References

2012 albums
Be'lakor albums